General elections were held in Tonga on 18 and 19 February 1987 to elect members of the Legislative Assembly of Tonga. Nine nobles and nine people's representatives were elected.  Five of the latter favoured democratic reform.

Results
Six of the nine People's Representatives were new to the Legislative Assembly, including Sione Matekihetuka, Laki Niu and ʻAkilisi Pōhiva from the Tongatapu constituency.

References

Tonga
1987 in Tonga
Elections in Tonga
February 1987 events in Oceania